Johnson-Grace is a data compression company based in the United States.

The company was founded by Steve Johnson and Chris Grace in Newport Beach, California in 1992 to develop a generic spreadsheet technology for simulation modeling. The founders later talked to Irving Reed at the University of Southern California, who had an idea for an improved image compression algorithm, and started implementing such an algorithm; this became the ART image file format.

The company was acquired by AOL on February 1, 1996, for approximately 1.6 million shares of stock.

Notes

Further reading
 

Defunct software companies of the United States